Chepelare Peak rises to approximately 900 m in the Friesland Ridge, Tangra Mountains, Livingston Island.  The peak surmounts Charity Glacier to the west and Prespa Glacier to the southeast and is named after the Bulgarian town of Chepelare.

Location
Bulgarian mapping in 2005 and 2009.

Maps
 L.L. Ivanov et al. Antarctica: Livingston Island and Greenwich Island, South Shetland Islands. Scale 1:100000 topographic map. Sofia: Antarctic Place-names Commission of Bulgaria, 2005.
 L.L. Ivanov. Antarctica: Livingston Island and Greenwich, Robert, Snow and Smith Islands. Scale 1:120000 topographic map.  Troyan: Manfred Wörner Foundation, 2009.

References
 Chepelare Peak. SCAR Composite Gazetteer of Antarctica
 Bulgarian Antarctic Gazetteer. Antarctic Place-names Commission. (details in Bulgarian, basic data in English)

External links
 Chepelare Peak. Copernix satellite image

Tangra Mountains